John Henry White Jr. (born November 10, 1933) is an American historian and museum curator.

Biography
John Hoxland White Jr., was born on November 10, 1933, in Cincinnati, Ohio. In his early years, he explored tanneries and the Cincinnati Union Terminal, where he was particularly interested in the roundhouse. From this, White developed a yearning to become a locomotive engineer. His first job during high school entailed working on a gearbox assembly line at the Triumph Manufacturing Company. He enrolled at Miami University, near his home, and during his college years worked at the McGowan Pump Company, where he learned drafting. In 1958, he graduated with bachelor's degree in modern European history from Miami University. As soon as he graduated he got an internship position as a museum aide at the Smithsonian Institution. His early years at the Smithsonian Institution were spent working on ship models for Howard I. Chapelle, the curator of transportation. His internship was extended from time to time until his position as made permanent in 1960, when he became an associate curator in the Land Transportation Section. From 1961 until 1966 he was an associate curator of railroads at the Museum of History and Technology (renamed the National Museum of American History, curator from 1967–1985, and senior historian from 1986 until his retirement in 1989.

White authored an important series of books on American railroad history. These carefully researched and well documented works are valuable for all students and enthusiasts of transportation history.

Works

References

Further reading

1933 births
Living people
Smithsonian Institution people
Miami University alumni
Writers from Cincinnati
20th-century American historians
American male non-fiction writers
21st-century American historians
21st-century American male writers
Historians from Ohio
20th-century American male writers